Islands in the Stream may refer to:

 Islands in the Stream (novel), a novel by Ernest Hemingway, published posthumously in 1970
 Islands in the Stream (film), a 1977 film adaptation of the Hemingway novel starring George C. Scott
 "Islands in the Stream" (song), a 1983 country and pop song, written by the Bee Gees and originally sung by Kenny Rogers and Dolly Parton
 "Islands in the Stream", a 2004 episode of Degrassi: The Next Generation

See also
 "Islanded in a Stream of Stars", an episode of the reimagined Battlestar Galactica